Sir Victor Basil John Seely, 4th Baronet (18 May 1900 – 10 May 1980) was the 4th  baronet of the Seely family, of Sherwood Lodge, Nottinghamshire, and son of Sir Charles Hilton Seely, 2nd Baronet.

Seely was educated at Eton College and Trinity College, Cambridge. During World War II he was a Major in the  9th Queen's Royal Lancers. He was Master of  the Worshipful Company of Gunmakers in 1957 and 1964.

Notes

1900 births
1980 deaths
People educated at Eton College
Alumni of Trinity College, Cambridge
Baronets in the Baronetage of the United Kingdom
9th Queen's Royal Lancers officers
Victor